Colleen Beaumier (born November 8, 1944) is a Canadian politician, who served in the House of Commons of Canada as a Liberal Member of Parliament from 1993 to 2008.

Pre-politics
Born in Chatham, Ontario, she studied at the University of Windsor, earning a bachelor of arts in psychology.  She and her husband Pierre are the parents of three adult children: Stephanie, Michael and John; Stephanie ran for Brampton City Council in the 2006 election but was defeated.

Before enter politics, she taught at the Ontario School for Mentally Challenged Children, served as a community member of the Ontario Parole Board, worked as a controller at a trucking firm and, at the time of her election, she was the vice-president of a bioanalytical services firm employing more than 100 people.  Her involvement in international human rights began in 1980. As area co-ordinator of Operation Lifeline, she assisted Vietnamese refugees settling in the Toronto area.

Political career
Beaumier was first elected in 1993 in the riding of Brampton. In 1997, she was re-elected, this time in the newly created riding of Brampton West—Mississauga, where she won again on November 27, 2000.  During the federal election of 2004, she defeated former provincial Minister of Health Tony Clement in the newly created riding of Brampton West.  In 2006, she was again re-elected, her fifth such mandate.

As a Member of Parliament, she has remained a frequent spokesperson for human rights. At the 1995 global conference on the Inter-Parliamentary Union at the United Nations, she spoke on the dangers of global income disparities. In response to human rights violations uncovered during the Somali Inquiry, she authored a private member's bill, Bill C-208, which increased transparency in the bureaucracy and established tougher penalties for the destruction of documents.

Beaumier served on numerous parliamentary committees, most notably serving as chair of the Subcommittee on Human Rights and International Development and the Subcommittee on Veterans Affairs. She also served as vice-chair of Standing Committee on Foreign Affairs and International Trade. In 2003, she served as parliamentary secretary to the Minister of National Revenue and later as the associate critic for the Canada Border Services Agency.

She announced on September 5, 2008 that she would not be running in the 2008 election. She was succeeded by Andrew Kania.

Electoral record

|}

|}

|-

References

External links
 How'd They Vote?: Colleen Beaumier, voting history and quotes

1944 births
21st-century Canadian politicians
21st-century Canadian women politicians
Liberal Party of Canada MPs
Living people
Members of the House of Commons of Canada from Ontario
People from Chatham-Kent
Politicians from Brampton
Women in Ontario politics
Women members of the House of Commons of Canada